Botero is a surname of Italian origin, common in Colombia and along with other similar variants (Boter, Boteri, Botter, Botteri, Bottero), it originated in the Piedmont region of Italy, more specifically, in the town of Bene Vagienna, province of Cuneo.

In the present time, Colombia is the country with the largest number of people holding this surname. The founder of this family in Colombia was Giovanni Andrea Botero Bernavi, born in the Republic of Genoa, region of Liguria, Italy.

Origin and etymology 
It is an occupational surname that originated in the Middle Ages, around year 500 CE, during which time people made barrels for the storage and transportation of liquids and solids such as wine, water, honey, gunpowder, grains, salt and sugar.

At that time, when the Piedmont region was part of the Roman Empire, Boterus was the name given to the people who made the barrels in the town of Bene Vagienna.

Giovanni Botero, an important character born in Bene 

In the town of Bene Vagienna, around year 1533 CE. Jesuit priest, statesman, economist and writer Giovanni Botero Benese was born. He was the author of literary works such as The Reason of State (Della ragion di Stato) of 1589 and On the Causes of the Greatness and Magnificence of Cities (Delle cause della grandezza e magnificenza delle città) of 1588, among others.

He spent his childhood in a Piedmont region occupied and looted by foreign powers of the time and received religious education since his adolescence, attending the Society of Jesus School in the city of Palermo, thanks to the help of his uncle, the Jesuit Father Giovenale Botero, who held a religious position in that city.

He was known for his literary, religious, historical and political works, but he is also considered one of the greatest Italian mercantilists.

In the 18th century, in his honor, a monument was built in Bene Vagienna in the so-called Piazza Botero, a central square located in front of the Church of Santa Maria Assunta (Chiesa di Santa Maria Assunta) and surrounded by historic buildings, such as the town hall Comune di Bene Vagienna.

Likewise, in honor of Botero, streets bearing his name were built in the cities of Turin, Rome and Rimini, in Italy.

Foundation of the Botero surname in Colombia 

This surname arrived in today's Republic of Colombia, in the 18th century, after the arrival of the Genoese Giovanni Andrea Botero Bernavi (Juan Andrés, in Spanish) from Cádiz, Spain to the city of Cartagena de Indias, Viceroyalty of New Granada around the year 1715, who worked in the service of the Spanish Crown as naval gunner of the Santa Rosa ship, built in the Republic of Genoa for King Philip V of Bourbon.

The main purpose of this trip was to take to present-day Peru, along with his companions, the Prince of Santo Buono, newly appointed Viceroy of Peru, Carmine Nicolau Caracciol, who suffered a family calamity after the death on board of his wife, when giving birth.

Among other factors, that event caused the boat to make a stop in Cartagena, where due to illness, Botero had to give up continuing his trip to Peru. Not being a Spanish citizen, he had to request a special permit from the Real Audiencia to be able to settle in the territory of the Viceroyalty of New Granada.

Botero traveled from the Caribbean coast to the interior of the territory, settling in the San Nicolás Valley, Rionegro, Antioquia, where he dedicated himself to gold mining.
Right there, he married Doña Antonia Mejía Somoano, on June 26, 1719, thus founding the Botero family in Colombia, a country where this surname has the largest number of descendants at the present time.

The Botero family in Colombia, in current times 

Nowadays, the members of the Botero family in Colombia, all descendants of the Italian Giovanni Andrea Botero and the Spaniard Antonia Mejía, are located in various areas and municipalities of the country, with a predominant presence in the city of Medellín, some towns in Antioquia such as Sonsón, La Ceja, La Unión and Abejorral, the main Colombian coffee growing region including the cities of Armenia, Pereira and Manizales and in other areas, such as the cities of Bogotá and Cali.

One of its best-known members is the artist Fernando Botero Angulo, born in the city of Medellín, a character recognized in many countries around the world for his paintings, sculptures and artistic drawings, which have been exhibited in large cities of various continents.

Fernando Botero has residences in the cities of New York, Paris and also in the municipality of Pietrasanta, region of Tuscany, Italy, a town where art works of his authorship are exhibited.

Among women, one of the most notable people is the actress and presenter María Cecilia Botero, who has been recognized as one of the great artists and symbols of television in Colombia for decades. In 2021, she participated as the Spanish voice  of the grandmother Alma Madrigal in the Disney animated film, Encanto.

Notable people with this surname include

Art and Entertainment 
 Ana Cristina Botero (born 1968), Colombian actress 
 Fernando Botero (born 1932), Colombian figurative artist
 María Cecilia Botero (born 1955), Colombian actress and journalist
 Naty Botero (born 1980), Colombian model and singer

Human rights
  Catalina Botero (born 1965), Colombian attorney

Literature and Philosophy 
 Darío Botero (1938 – 2010), Colombian writer and philosopher
 Giovanni Botero ( 1544 – 1617), Italian writer, thinker, priest, poet, and diplomat
 Giuseppe Botero (1815 – 1885), Italian writer and educator

Politics 
 Alberto Santofimio Botero (born 1942), Colombian politician
 Beatriz Elena Uribe Botero, Colombian politician
 Enrique Gil Botero (born 1953), Colombian politician and attorney
 Fernando Botero Zea (born 1956), Colombian-Mexican politician
 Guillermo Botero (born 1948), Colombian lawyer, businessman, lecturer, and politician
 Luis Alfredo Ramos Botero (born 1948), Colombian politician and attorney

Religion 
 Tulio Botero (1904 – 1981), Colombian ecclesiastic of the Catholic Church

Sports 
 Alejandro Botero (born 1980), Colombian footballer
 Andrés Botero (born 1945), Colombian sports leader
 Jhonnatan Botero (born 1992), Colombian cyclist
 Joaquín Botero (born 1977), Bolivian footballer
 Juan Sebastián Botero (born 1986), Colombian-American footballer
 Santiago Botero (born 1972), Colombian cyclist

Other 
 Juan Carlos Botero, Colombian legal researcher
 Néstor Botero Goldsworthy (1919-1996), Colombian journalist, writer and merchant

See also 
 Cooper (profession)
 Italian Colombian

References

External links 

 Piazza Giovanni Botero, Bene Vagienna, Italy – Google Maps

Occupational surnames
Italian-language surnames
Onomastics